Hatton is a former civil parish, now in the parishes of Hargrave and Huxley, Golborne David and Tattenhall and District, in the unitary authority of Cheshire West and Chester and ceremonial county of Cheshire, England. The civil parish was abolished in 2015 and became part of Hargrave and Huxley, Golborne David and Tattenhall and District.

In the 2001 census it had a population of 120,  The population in the 2011 census was 198, which included the parish of Golborne Bellow.

History
The name Hatton means "heath farm/settlement" and likely derives from the Old English words hǣð (heather, a tract of uncultivated land) and tūn (a farmstead or settlement).

Hatton was mentioned in the Domesday Book of 1086 as Etune, 
under the ownership of Ilbert of Roullours. The entry lists only one household (a villager), making it amongst the smallest 20% of settlements recorded in the survey.

The settlement was a township within Waverton parish, Broxton Hundred, which became a civil parish in 1866. The population was recorded at 152 in 1801, then 164 in 1851, 134 in 1901 and decreasing to 126 by 1951.

Landmarks
Hatton Hall moated site is an ancient monument and dates to c.1200. The moat surrounds an island of approximately 60m x 55m upon which stood the hall, a quadrangular structure of timber.
The hall was replaced by the present farm house c.1830 and a sandstone revetted causeway was constructed in the early 19th century. These are both Grade II listed buildings.

References

Notes

Citations

External links

Former civil parishes in Cheshire
Cheshire West and Chester